Church of St. Emeric was a Roman Catholic parish church in the Roman Catholic Archdiocese of New York, located at Avenue D, between 12th Street and 13th Street, Manhattan, New York City. The address is 740 East 13th Street. When restoration was completed on St. Brigid's on Avenue B in 2013, the Church of St. Emeric was closed and the parishes merged to form the parish of St. Brigid-St. Emeric.

History
The parish was established in 1949. The Rev. V. J. Brosman had a brick church built in 1949 to designs by Voorhees, Walker, Foley & Smith of 101 Park Ave. for $300,000. The cornerstone was laid in 1950. The church is now covered in ivy. A two-storey school building was erected in 1952 to designs by the same architects for $240,000.

References 

Roman Catholic churches completed in 1950
20th-century Roman Catholic church buildings in the United States
Christian organizations established in 1949
Roman Catholic churches in Manhattan
Modernist architecture in New York City
East Village, Manhattan
1949 establishments in New York City